The City of Ararat was a local government area about  west-northwest of Melbourne, the state capital of Victoria, Australia. It existed from 1858 until 1994.

It was surrounded by the separate and largely rural Shire of Ararat.

History

Ararat was first incorporated as a borough on 24 September 1858, known as the Municipal District of Ararat, headed by chairmen. In 1862, it was declared as a borough and known as the Borough of Ararat, headed by mayors. It was declared as a town on 29 May 1934, and on 24 May 1950, it was proclaimed as a city. It received some land from the surrounding Shire of Ararat on 27 May 1960.

On 23 September 1994, the City of Ararat was abolished, and along with the Shire of Ararat and parts of the Shire of Stawell, was merged into the newly created Rural City of Ararat.

The former town hall was National Trust listed and later adaptively reused as the Ararat Regional Art Gallery, managed by the Rural City of Ararat. It was designed by Molloy and Smith and built in 1899.

Population

* Estimate in the 1958 Victorian Year Book.

Chairmen and mayors

Chairmen
 1858-60 Cr F Lowe
 1860-61 Cr JD Smith
 1861-62 Cr TM Girdlestone
 1862-62 Cr WR Mitchell

Mayors
 1862-66 Cr T Walker
 1866-68 Cr GWH Grano
 1868-69 Cr C Mulcahy
 1869-70 Cr W Rundell
 1870-71 Cr WH Dawson
 1871-72 Cr W Rundell
 1872-73 Cr J Tuson
 1873-74 Cr GWH Grano
 1874-75 Cr WH Dawson
 1875-76 Cr GWH Grano
 1876-77 Cr W Beveridge
 1877-78 Cr JD Smith
 1878-79 Cr D Gordon
 1879-80 Cr T Tobin
 1880-81 Cr J Hewitt
 1881-82 Cr J Tuson
 1882-83 Cr MC Nott
 1883-84 Cr T Flattely
 1884-85 Cr J Crouch
 1885-86 Cr J Tuson
 1886-87 Cr T Tobin
 1887-88 Cr WH Dawson
 1888-89 Cr H Thompson
 1889-90 Cr T Tobin
 1890-91 Cr TW Palmer
 1891-92 Cr H Dodd
 1892-93 Cr E Boberski
 1893-94 Cr WE Nichols
 1894-95 Cr T Tobin
 1895-96 Cr G Burns
 1896-97 Cr T Tobin
 1897-98 Cr E Boberski
 1998-99 Cr EJ Simpson
 1899–1900 Cr WH Elliott
 1900-01 Cr D Hamilton
 1901-02 Cr R Hargreaves
 1902-04 Cr TA Wild
 1904-05 Cr E Boberski
 1905-06 Cr TA Wild
 1906-07 Cr EJ Simpson
 1907-08 Cr R Hargreaves
 1908-10 Cr J Moore
 1910-12 Cr J Irwin
 1912-14 Cr G Burn
 1914-15 Cr W Tibbles
 1915-16 Cr J Irwin
 1916-17 Cr JJ Northey
 1917-18 Cr T Impey
 1918-19 Cr TJ Gossip
 1919-20 Cr WH Mackay
 1920-21 Cr EC McGibbony
 1921-22 Cr J Moore
 1922-23 Cr WH Toole
 1923-24 Cr G Bryant
 1924-26 Cr W Timmins
 1926-27 Cr J Irwin
 1927-28 Cr HJ Blackie
 1928-30 Cr WH Toole
 1930-32 Cr J Moore
 1932-33 Cr WL Brewster

References

External links
 Victorian Places - Ararat

Ararat City